Hannoa is a genus of plant in the family Simaroubaceae. It contains the following species (but this list may be incomplete):

 Hannoa kitombetombe
 Hannoa klaineana and Hannoa chlorantha. Both of these "are used in traditional medicine of Central African countries against fevers and malaria."

References

 
Sapindales genera
Plants used in traditional African medicine
Taxonomy articles created by Polbot